Dana Ford (born June 9, 1984) is an American college basketball coach who is the head coach for Missouri State University since March 21, 2018. Prior to coaching the Bears, he was the head coach at Tennessee State from 2014 through the 2018 season. Ford is a former basketball player, having played at Illinois State from 2002 to 2006. After not being selected in the 2006 NBA draft, the Tamms, Illinois native joined the Tennessee State Tigers coaching staff under head coach John Cooper. He has previously been with Wichita State and Illinois State through his coaching career, playing a key role in the teams' recruiting and overall success.

Playing career 

Ford attended Egyptian Senior High School in Tamms, Illinois. He became one of the most dangerous high school guards in the area and broke the school record for points scored by the end of his final season. Ford was coached by former All-State point guard Brad Sinks. Sinks would refer to Ford as “the puppet master” because of the way Ford could handle it on a string. To this day, Ford credits Coach Sinks for teaching him to play angry and hard nosed, which is seen in his coaching. Ford was named First Team Class A All-State and a two-time conference player of the year. At the conclusion of his basketball years in high school, the shooting guard averaged 22 points per game. It was highly anticipated that he would bring his talent to the Illinois State Redbirds men's basketball team, choosing the school over other possibilities such as Evansville, Southern Illinois, and Southeast Missouri State.

In his first season with Illinois State, Ford hardly made a significant impact on the team's backcourt scoring. He finished the season averaging 2.0 points, 2.5 rebounds, and 0.6 assists. Ford made eight starts in the entire year and scored his first points in his fourth collegiate appearance against Chattanooga. His sophomore year would be far less successful, with Ford playing just twenty games in the season. Similarly went the following season, but he scored double-digits in the team's postseason game against Creighton. In Ford's final season, he recorded over nine points eight times through the season and logged a career-high 16 points as a starting guard against Grambling State. By the end of his senior year, he ranked within the Missouri Valley Conference's Top 10 under the steals and blocks categories. Ford was also named the squad's defensive player of the year due to this success.

Ford entered the 2006 NBA Draft, which turned unsuccessful after he was not selected by a single team at the conclusion of the event.

Coaching career 

Ford began his career on the coaching staff at Winthrop, when he was named a graduate assistant. Under head coach Gregg Marshall, the team qualified for an NCAA Tournament berth. He continued holding the same position as he joined Wichita State with Marshall the next season. The Shockers continued to prevail and made another appearance in their postseason tournament.

Ford's first year serving as an assistant coach was at Chipola College, where he led the Indians to an impressive 35–2 overall record and a third-place spot in the NJCAA National Tournament. The team also won its fifth consecutive FCCAA State Championship.
His second team as an assistant coach was Tennessee State, where he helped John Cooper lead the team. The Tigers finished with a winning record and an exceptional performance against Murray State. Ford most notably helped in recruiting NBA player Robert Covington to his team roster.

After Tennessee State, Ford returned to Wichita State to serve as an assistant coach under Gregg Marshall. This was his third time coaching alongside Marshall, who made the remark, "This is how much I think of Dana Ford. At age 26, this is the third time I have invited Dana to join my staff…he was first my graduate assistant at Winthrop, followed me to Wichita State, and then after sending him out into the world to Chipola, and to Tennessee State, where he has helped coach Cooper recruit a fine young group of players, I am inviting him back." The Shockers finished the season and Ford was instrumental to their conference tournament victory and an NCAA Tournament appearance.

Ford came back to Illinois State to become the team's assistant coach. He was also named the recruiting coordinator to add on to his original coaching duties.

Following his two seasons with his alma mater, Ford returned to Tennessee State for his first experience as a head coach. The position was secured after Travis Williams left the team following a 5–25 season.

After going 5–26 in his inaugural season as head coach, Ford orchestrated the largest NCAA turnaround from 2014–15 to 2015–16 with a 15-win difference. In 2015–16, Ford was named the OVC Coach of the Year, led his team to 20 wins, and a berth in the CIT postseason tournament. He was also named the 2016 National Association of Basketball Coaches (NABC) District 19 Coach of the Year, CollegeInsiders.com's Ben Jobe Award Winner, and the BOXTOROW Coach of the Year.

Head coaching record

Personal life
Ford is a Christian. Ford is married to Christina Ford. They have two daughters, Charlie Rose and Cline, and three sons, Cameron, Carson, and Crain. Their daughter, Promise, died in infancy.

Ford is a supporter of his wife’s charity, The Rebound Foundation, a non-profit that works to provide transitional housing to women and children who’ve experienced domestic abuse and educate on healthy relationships.

References 

1984 births
Living people
American men's basketball players
Basketball coaches from Illinois
Basketball players from Illinois
College men's basketball head coaches in the United States
Illinois State Redbirds men's basketball coaches
Illinois State Redbirds men's basketball players
Junior college men's basketball coaches in the United States
Missouri State Bears basketball coaches
People from Alexander County, Illinois
Tennessee State Tigers basketball coaches
Wichita State Shockers men's basketball coaches
Shooting guards